Stuart Michael Childerley (born 17 February 1966) is a British sailor. He competed in the 1988 and 1992 Summer Olympics. He is now an International Race Officer.

References

1966 births
Living people
People from Lowestoft
British male sailors (sport)
Olympic sailors of Great Britain
Sailors at the 1988 Summer Olympics – Finn
Sailors at the 1992 Summer Olympics – Finn